Adult Life Skills (formerly known as 'How To Live Yours') is a 2016 British comedy film, funded by Creative England, and is the feature debut for writer director Rachel Tunnard. It is the feature-length version of BAFTA-nominated short, Emotional Fusebox, which premiered at the London Film Festival in 2014. The story of a 29-year-old, Anna (portrayed by Jodie Whittaker) has moved into her mum's shed and is refusing to move out after the death of her twin brother.

The film premiered at the 2016 Tribeca Film Festival in April 2016, winning one of the top awards - the Nora Ephron prize for best female director.

Plot

Since her twin brother Billy died, Anna is stuck. She is approaching 30, living like a hermit in her mum Marion's garden shed and spending her days making videos using her thumbs as actors but without showing them to anyone and no one knows what they are for. A week before her birthday her Mum serves her an ultimatum – she needs to move out of the shed, get a haircut and stop dressing like a homeless teenager. However, when her school friend comes to visit, Anna's self-imposed isolation becomes impossible to maintain. Soon she is entangled with Clint, a troubled eight-year-old boy whose mother is seriously ill and the local estate agent Brendan whose awkward interpersonal skills continually undermine his attempts to seduce her.

Cast

Jodie Whittaker as Anna
Ozzy Myers as Clint
Edward Hogg as Billy
Brett Goldstein as Brendan
Alice Lowe as Alice
Lorraine Ashbourne as Marion
Eileen Davies as Jean
Rachael Deering as Fiona
Christian Contreras as Hank, Clint's father

References

External links 

 
 
 

2016 films
2016 comedy-drama films
British comedy-drama films
Films set in Yorkshire
Films about twins
2010s English-language films
2010s British films